Leo Beenhakker CM (born 2 August 1942) is a Dutch football coach. He has had an extensive and successful career both at club and international level. He led both Ajax and Feyenoord to Dutch championships and also had domestic success with Real Madrid. At international level, he led Trinidad and Tobago to the 2006 FIFA World Cup and Poland to UEFA Euro 2008, both firsts for each nation. His role in Spanish football has earned him the nickname Don Leo, largely due to his fondness of cigars and dry humour.

Playing career 
A right winger, Beenhakker played at amateur clubs , XerxesDZB and Zwart-Wit '28.

Coaching career 
Beenhakker has been the coach of several prestigious clubs including Ajax, Feyenoord, Real Madrid, SC Veendam, Club America and Real Zaragoza. He has also coached the national teams of Saudi Arabia, Poland and the Netherlands. He coached the Trinidad and Tobago national team in the year leading up to the 2006 FIFA World Cup. Under Beenhakker's guidance, the team secured a 0–0 draw against Sweden in their first match, and gave England cause for concern in the second match.

From 2000 to 2003, Beenhakker was director of technical affairs with Ajax. In that period, he fired head coach Co Adriaanse and replaced him with Ronald Koeman.

Poland 
On 11 July 2006, Beenhakker was appointed as the manager of the Poland national team. Originally, he was appointed to manage Poland until the end of UEFA Euro 2008, however his contract was extended until November 2009, the end of qualifying for the 2010 World Cup. On 17 November 2007, after Poland defeated Belgium 2–0, he managed to qualify Poland for the UEFA European Championship for their first time – even in Poland's "golden years" of the 1970s and '80s, the nation never qualified for the Euro final stages. On 20 February 2008, Beenhakker was decorated with the Order of Polonia Restituta by President of Poland Lech Kaczyński. The Order is conferred for outstanding achievements in the fields of education, science, sport, culture, art, economics, defense of the country, social work, civil service, or for furthering good relations between countries. However, after Poland's failure to qualify for the 2010 World Cup, Beenhakker was sacked.

Feyenoord
While still in charge of Poland, Feyenoord hired Beenhakker on 5 May 2007 as an interim coach to lead the club through the 2006–07 play-offs. After his departure from Poland, he was named the sports director of the club, signing a contract on 9 October 2009 lasting until 30 June 2011.

Újpest
Following his spell in the Netherlands, Beenhakker agreed on a three-year deal with Hungarian first division side Újpest, and was officially introduced as the new sports director of the purple-whites in a press conference on 29 July 2011. As managing director Csaba Bartha revealed, Beenhakker's main duty was to work with the first team. However, the club also intended to use his diverse and extensive personal relationships to establish a scouting network across Europe, which could be used in both directions. His contract was terminated in October 2011, after Belgian businessman Roderick Duchatelet, son of Roland Duchâtelet, purchased the club.

In December 2013, Beenhakker was appointed technical director at Sparta Rotterdam, a position he held on to until June 2015, before announcing his retirement from football. In November 2017, he joined the Sparta board as a technical advisor, which he did voluntarily until Sparta found a technical director. When in March 2018 Sparta appointed Henk van Stee, Beenhakker left his spot and announced his retirement again.

Languages 
Beenhakker speaks several languages, including Dutch, English and Spanish. He also learned a few words in Polish during his time as national team manager.

Personal life
As coach of the Trinidad and Tobago squad that competed at the 2006 FIFA World Cup in Germany, Beenhakker was awarded the Chaconia Medal (Gold Class), the second highest state decoration of Trinidad and Tobago.

Honours 
Ajax
 Eredivisie: 1979–80, 1989–90

Real Madrid
 La Liga: 1986–87, 1987–88, 1988–89
 Copa del Rey: 1988–89
 Supercopa de España: 1988, 1989*
(* Won Copa del Rey and La Liga)

Feyenoord
 Eredivisie: 1998–99
 Johan Cruyff Shield: 1999

Individual
 Chaconia Medal, Gold Class: 2006
 Order of Polonia Restituta, Officer's Cross: 2008

References

External links 
 

1942 births
Living people
Dutch footballers
Footballers from Rotterdam
Association football wingers
XerxesDZB players
Zwart-Wit '28 players
Dutch football managers
Go Ahead Eagles non-playing staff
SC Veendam managers
SC Cambuur managers
Go Ahead Eagles managers
Feyenoord non-playing staff
AFC Ajax non-playing staff
AFC Ajax managers
Real Zaragoza managers
FC Volendam managers
Netherlands national football team managers
Real Madrid CF managers
Grasshopper Club Zürich managers
Saudi Arabia national football team managers
Club América managers
İstanbulspor managers
C.D. Guadalajara managers
SBV Vitesse managers
Feyenoord managers
Directors of football clubs in the Netherlands
De Graafschap non-playing staff
Trinidad and Tobago national football team managers
Poland national football team managers
Sparta Rotterdam non-playing staff
Eerste Divisie managers
Eredivisie managers
La Liga managers
Swiss Super League managers
Liga MX managers
Süper Lig managers
Rinus Michels Award winners
Recipients of the Chaconia Medal
1990 FIFA World Cup managers
2006 FIFA World Cup managers
UEFA Euro 2008 managers
Dutch expatriate football managers
Dutch expatriate sportspeople in Spain
Dutch expatriate sportspeople in Switzerland
Dutch expatriate sportspeople in Saudi Arabia
Dutch expatriate sportspeople in Mexico
Dutch expatriate sportspeople in Turkey
Dutch expatriate sportspeople in Trinidad and Tobago
Dutch expatriate sportspeople in Poland
Dutch expatriate sportspeople in Hungary
Expatriate football managers in Spain
Expatriate football managers in Switzerland
Expatriate football managers in Saudi Arabia
Expatriate football managers in Mexico
Expatriate football managers in Turkey
Expatriate football managers in Trinidad and Tobago
Expatriate football managers in Poland
Officers of the Order of Polonia Restituta